Ferrán Sarsanedas Soler (born 11 February 1997) is a Spanish professional footballer who plays as a defensive midfielder for Elche CF Ilicitano.

Club career
Born in Amer, Girona, Catalonia, Sarsanedas joined FC Barcelona's youth setup in 2007, from Girona FC. Ahead of the 2016–17 campaign, he was promoted to the reserves in Segunda División B, and made his senior debut on 27 August 2016 by coming on as a substitute for Fali in a 3–1 away win against Hércules CF.

Sarsanedas contributed with 33 appearances for the side, achieving promotion to Segunda División in the play-offs. On 29 August 2017 he made his professional debut, starting in a 0–3 home loss against CD Tenerife.

Career statistics

References

External links
FC Barcelona official profile

1997 births
Living people
People from Selva
Sportspeople from the Province of Girona
Spanish footballers
Footballers from Catalonia
Association football midfielders
Segunda División players
Segunda División B players
Tercera Federación players
FC Barcelona Atlètic players
Elche CF Ilicitano footballers
Spain youth international footballers